Nahend or Nahand may refer to:
 Nahand, East Azerbaijan, Iran
 Nahend, Hormozgan, Iran